The 1935 Winter 100 was a motor race held at the Phillip Island circuit, near Cowes on Phillip Island, in Victoria, Australia on 3 June 1935.	
The race, which was organised by the Light Car Club of Australia, was staged over 16 laps, a total distance of 100 miles.
It was contested on a handicap basis with the first car scheduled to start 19 minutes 45 seconds before the Scratch car.
	
The race was won by A Barrett driving a Morris Cowley from a handicap of 20 minutes 30 seconds. JW Williamson (Riley Imp), who started from Scratch, set the fastest race time and the fastest race lap and was placed second on handicap.

Results	
	

The above table lists the fifteen entries for which handicaps were published. It is not known if any of the entries failed to start the race.

Notes	
 Entries: 15
 Starters: Unknown	
 Finishers (within time limit): 5
 Winner's average speed: 62 mph
 Fastest time: JW Williamson, 1h 22m 48s, 76.01 mph
 Fastest lap: JW Williamson, 5m 1s, 78 mph

Race name	
Sources vary as to the actual race name with "Winter 100", "winter 100 miles race" and "100-miles Winter Handicap"  all being used in contemporary sources.

References	
	
	
Motorsport at Phillip Island	
Winter 100